Ousmane Traoré (born 16 February 1985) is a Senegalese former professional footballer who played as a forward.

Career
Good performances for K.S.K. Beveren and KFC Turnhout in the Belgian Second Division earned Traoré a move to Ligue 2 club Laval.

References

Living people
1985 births
Association football forwards
Senegalese footballers
Association football wingers
Ligue 2 players
Championnat National 2 players
Challenger Pro League players
CO Châlons players
US Roye-Noyon players
K.S.K. Beveren players
KFC Turnhout players
Stade Lavallois players
FC Dieppe players
FC Vevey United players